Reiko Tamura can refer to:
 A character in The Man with the Red Tattoo
 A character in Parasyte (known as Tamara Rockford in the Mixx version)